This list is based on CIA The World Factbook (when no citation is given). or other authoritative third-party sources (as cited). Based on data from EIA, at the start of 2021, proved gas reserves were dominated by three countries: Iran, Russia, and Qatar.

There is some disagreement on which country has the largest proven gas reserves. Sources that consider that Russia has by far the largest proven reserves include the US CIA (47600 cubic kilometers), the US Energy Information Administration (EIA) (49000 km³), and OPEC (48810 km3). However, BP credits Russia with only 32900 km3, which would place it in second place, slightly behind Iran (33100 to 33800 km3, depending on the source).

Due to constant announcements of shale gas recoverable  reserves, as well as drilling in Central Asia, South America and Africa, deepwater drilling, estimates are undergoing frequent updates, mostly increasing. Since 2000, some countries, notably the US and Canada, have seen large increases in proved gas reserves due to development of shale gas, but shale gas deposits in most countries are yet to be added to reserve calculations.

Data 

* indicates "Natural gas in COUNTRY or TERRITORY" or "Natural resources of COUNTRY or TERRITORY" links.

Comparison of proven natural gas reserves from different sources (cubic kilometers, as of 31 December 2014/1 January 2015)

See also 
 List of countries by natural gas production
 List of countries by proven oil reserves
 List of natural gas fields

References 

Energy-related lists by country
 List
Lists of countries